Will Croft Barnes (June 21, 1858 – December 17, 1936), a private in the U.S. Army Signal Corps, was distinguished for his action in the battle at Fort Apache, Arizona Territory on September 11, 1881. When Fort Apache was besieged by warriors of Geronimo, Barnes escaped and rode to Fort Thomas. Soldiers from Fort Thomas came to the aid of Fort Apache. For his gallantry, Barnes received the Medal of Honor on November 8, 1882, the citation noting his "bravery in action."

Biography
He was born on June 21, 1858, and was the author of Arizona Place Names and associate editor of Arizona Historical Review, both published by the University of Arizona Press. He joined the Army from Washington, D.C. in July 1879, and was discharged with the rank of Sergeant in July 1883.

After leaving military service, Barnes worked as a rancher in Arizona, and served in the legislatures of Arizona Territory. He also wrote several books.

Beginning in 1907 he served for twenty-one years in the United States Forest Service. In this capacity he and a companion traveled across southern Texas to round up the last of the Longhorn cattle, thus saving the breed from extinction. The Longhorns were shipped to the Wichita Mountains Wildlife Refuge in Oklahoma.

He was born in San Francisco, California, and entered the service at Washington, D.C. He died in Phoenix, Arizona, and is buried with his wife Elizabeth Talbot (1873–1964) at Arlington National Cemetery, in Arlington, Virginia.

Namesake
The U.S. Army Reserve Center in Phoenix, Arizona and the Fort Huachuca Field House are named in his honor.  Two memorial plaques were dedicated to him in Papago Park designating Barnes Butte.

See also

 List of Medal of Honor recipients

References

Further reading
 Apaches & Longhorns: The Reminiscences of Will C. Barnes, Will Croft Barnes, Frank Cummins Lockwood, University of Arizona Press, 1982.
 Arizona Place Names, William Croft Barnes, Byrd H Granger, University of Arizona Press, 1987.
 "The Cowboy and His Songs", Will Croft Barnes, Saturday Evening Post, June 27, 1925.
 Tales from the X-bar Horse Camp: The Blue-roan "outlaw" and Other Stories, Will Croft Barnes, Breeders' Gazette, 1920.
 Western Grazing Grounds and Forest Ranges: A History of the Live-stock Industry as Conducted on the Open Ranges of the Arid West,  Will Croft Barnes, The Breeder's gazette, 1913.
 "Will Barnes and 'The Cowboy's Sweet By and By'," John Irwin White, in Git Along, Little Dogies: Songs and Songmakers of the American West, University of Illinois Press, 1975.

External links
 
 
 "Will C. Barnes: Soldier, Cowboy, Author and Storyteller." Marshall Trimble, True West magazine, April 11, 2018.
 

1858 births
1936 deaths
American people of the Indian Wars
United States Army Medal of Honor recipients
Burials at Arlington National Cemetery
People from San Francisco
United States Army soldiers
American Indian Wars recipients of the Medal of Honor